Kozhipattu is a small village located in Kanai block in Viluppuram District in the Indian state of Tamil Nadu.

External links 
List of Village Panchayats in Tamil Nadu (PDF) pp. 48–55. Government of Tamil Nadu, Rural Development & Panchayat Raj Department.

Villages in Viluppuram district